Kanon is a Japanese visual novel developed by Key, a brand of Visual Arts. It was released on June 4, 1999 for Windows as an adult game. Key later released versions of Kanon without the erotic content, and the game was ported to the Dreamcast, PlayStation 2, PlayStation Portable and Nintendo Switch. The story follows the life of Yuichi Aizawa, a high school student who returns to a city he last visited seven years prior, and he has little recollection of the events from back then. He meets several girls and slowly regains his lost memories. The gameplay in Kanon follows a branching plot line which offers pre-determined scenarios with courses of interaction, and focuses on the appeal of the five female main characters by the player character. The game once ranked as the second best-selling PC game sold in Japan, and charted in the national top 50 several more times afterwards. Kanon has sold over 300,000 units across several platforms.

Following the game's release, Kanon made several transitions into other media. Two manga series were serialized in Dengeki Daioh and Dragon Age Pure. Comic anthologies, light novels and art books were also published, as were audio dramas and several music albums. Toei Animation produced a 13-episode anime television series in 2002 and an original video animation (OVA) episode in 2003. Kyoto Animation produced a 24-episode anime series in 2006. The 2006 anime was licensed and dubbed in English by ADV Films in 2008, but the license was given to Funimation after ADV's closure. The 2006 anime plays on the association between Kanon and the musical term canon by using Pachelbel's Kanon D-dur, or Canon in D major, as a background piece at certain instances throughout the series.

Gameplay

Kanon is a romance visual novel in which the player assumes the role of Yuichi Aizawa. Much of its gameplay is spent on reading the story's narrative and dialogue. Kanon follows a branching plot line with multiple endings, and depending on the decisions that the player makes during the game, the plot will progress in a specific direction.

There are five main plot lines that the player will have the chance to experience, one for each of the heroines in the story. Throughout gameplay, the player is given multiple options to choose from, and text progression pauses at these points until a choice is made. To view all plot lines in their entirety, the player will have to replay the game multiple times and choose different choices to further the plot to an alternate direction. After Mai's scenario is completed, a replay of her route will offer an additional choice to play through Sayuri's back-story. Jun Maeda, who worked on the scenario for Kanon, commented in March 2001 that the Japanese public may have fallen under the impression that Key makes soothing games because of Kanons influence, but Maeda affirmed that there was not one person who worked on Kanon who thought that.

In the adult versions of the game, there are scenes with sexual CGs depicting Yuichi and a given heroine having sex. Later, Key released versions of Kanon without the erotic content. The versions that include the adult content have one explicit sex scene in each of the five main story routes, in addition to one fantasy scene. Outside of these, there are two scenes with nudity. Yūichi Suzumoto, a scenario writer who worked on later Key titles, commented that the sex scenes in Kanon are very self-contained, and can be easily removed without altering the story. Maeda remarked that the sex scenes were not written with reproduction in mind.

Plot
Setting and themes
There are several important locations featured in the Kanon story, though the location names are seldom mentioned explicitly in Key's works. The events of the story occur during winter, and since it often snows periodically over the course of the entire story, the city is always presented covered in a layer of snow. The shopping district is featured throughout the story when the characters go into town, and especially whenever Ayu appears in the early story. The high school where Yuichi and the other main characters attend, including the school grounds, is shown predominantly in Shiori's and Mai's stories, and is otherwise a general setting where Yuichi interacts with other characters.

There are recurring themes that appear throughout the story. A music theme is present, as the episode titles from the 2006–2007 anime have parts in their titles related to music, such as overture and introit. Miracles play a large part in the story; Kanons plot line and characters are influenced by various instances where miracles occur. The act of promising and keeping promises is found throughout the story. Yuichi eventually makes important promises to the five main girls while at the same time fulfilling past promises he had made with four of them when he used to visit the city as a kid.

One of the motifs in the story is amnesia, or memory loss; three of the main characters—Yuichi, Ayu and Makoto—suffer from amnesia in varying degrees; this is used as a plot device to advance the story. Another motif deals with the favorite foods of the five main heroines. Newtype USA stated in an article on Kanon that "it's when the characters are eating something really tasty that they seem most beautiful and alive", despite the somber setting and overall tone of the series. These five foods of choice are: taiyaki (Ayu), strawberries (Nayuki), nikuman (Makoto), ice cream (Shiori), and gyudon (Mai).

Principal characters

The player assumes the role of Yuichi Aizawa, the protagonist of Kanon. He is a cynical 17-year-old high school student, and is known to play jokes on the girls his age he knows and interacts with throughout the story. Despite this, Yuichi is very loyal and will go to great lengths to please others, even at the expense of his own time and money. He generally has a selfless personality and does not ask much from others in return for what he does for them. Ayu Tsukimiya, the main heroine of Kanon, is a short, strange, and mysterious girl immediately recognizable by her winged backpack, red hair band, and tendency to refer to herself with the masculine first-person pronoun . She has a fondness for eating taiyaki, and is notorious for her catchphrase, which she mutters as an expression of various negative emotions such as frustration, pain, and fear. Yuichi's first cousin Nayuki Minase, another of Kanons heroines, has been in love with him since childhood, and must learn how to deal with her feelings, especially with the threat that he may fall in love with one of the other girls. Nayuki talks noticeably slower than those around her, and has constant trouble waking up in the morning except on a few occasions when she is up before Yuichi, much to his surprise.

Yuichi is accosted a few days after arriving in the city by Kanon'''s third heroine Makoto Sawatari, a young girl who has lost her memories, but despite this she is sure that she holds a grudge against Yuichi from when he last visited the city. Makoto has a mischievous side and constantly plays pranks on Yuichi. She has an affinity towards the spring and once wished that it would stay spring forever. Yuichi coincidentally runs into Shiori Misaka, another heroine and first-year high school student suffering from an unexplained illness since birth. Her affliction has caused her to become very physically weak, and she is almost always absent from school because of it. She tries to be strong in the face of her condition, and gets along well with others, even though she does not know very many people her age due to her condition. The fifth and final heroine in Kanon is Mai Kawasumi, a third-year student of the same high school that Yuichi attends. She has a cold attitude towards almost everyone, but despite this, she is actually a very kind and caring person; she "punishes" someone who makes a playful joke about her by giving them a light karate chop to the head.

StoryKanons story revolves around a group of five girls whose lives are connected to the same boy. Yuichi Aizawa is a second-year high school student who had visited the city where the story takes place seven years prior to Kanons beginning. The story opens on Wednesday January 6, 1999 when Yuichi arrives in the city and is very detached from it and its inhabitants. Prior to his return, it is decided that he is to stay with his first cousin, Nayuki Minase, and her mother, Akiko. After his long absence, Yuichi has forgotten almost everything except minor details of what happened seven years before and is in need of being reminded of what he left behind. Nayuki initially tries repeatedly to jog his memory, but is unsuccessful. Throughout the story, as he learns about the supernatural undertones of the city, Yuichi is reminded of the events of seven years ago.

On the day after Yuichi's return, he is out with Nayuki who is showing him around the city. Nayuki remembers that she has to buy things for dinner, but Yuichi is reluctant to go into the store with her. Moments after Nayuki leaves him waiting on the sidewalk, a strange girl named Ayu Tsukimiya collides with him with little warning. Upon recovering, she drags him away to a nearby café and confesses to inadvertently stealing a bag filled with taiyaki after being accidentally scared away by the salesman before she had a chance to pay. They decide to meet up again another day and Ayu scampers off. A few days after he has been in the city, Yuichi is accosted by a girl named Makoto Sawatari who has lost her memories, though still remembers that she has a grudge against him from when he last visited the city. After she collapses in the street, he takes her home and learns about her situation. Akiko gives her permission to live with them for the time being, which is against Yuichi's plan to hand her over to the police.

Another girl who is connected to Yuichi's past is Mai Kawasumi who attends his high school as a third-year. She takes it upon herself to fight and defeat demons at night while the school is deserted. Due to this, she is constantly blamed for accidents because she never denies them, being too sincere to say anything and knowing that no one will believe that there are demons in the school. Yuichi coincidentally meets a fifth girl named Shiori Misaka who he gets to know along with the other four heroines in the story. She has suffered from an unexplained affliction since birth which makes her weak to the point of missing school because of it. Yuichi starts to talk with her more after noticing her in the school courtyard one day. It turns out that Shiori stands outside on the school grounds nearly every day because she wants to meet someone dear to her.

Development
Most of Kanons development staff originally worked for the visual novel publisher Nexton under the brand Tactics. After the release of the brand's third game One: Kagayaku Kisetsu e, most of Tactics' staff left Nexton to pursue work in another publishing company where they could have the freedom to produce their next game. Itaru Hinoue, who had previously worked at Visual Arts once before, introduced Key's founding members to the president of Visual Arts, Takahiro Baba. Baba gave the developers the freedom they desired, and they officially transferred to Visual Arts where they formed Key on July 21, 1998 and started production on Kanon. The planning for the visual novel was headed by Naoki Hisaya who was also one of two scenario writers with Jun Maeda. Hisaya wrote the scenarios for Ayu, Nayuki and Shiori, while Maeda wrote the routes for Makoto and Mai. Art direction was headed by Key's artist Itaru Hinoue who worked on the character design and computer graphics. Further computer graphics were split between three people—Dinn, Miracle Mikipon, Shinory—and background art was provided by Torino. The music in the game was composed by OdiakeS, Shinji Orito and Jun Maeda. Kanon was the first and last visual novel developed by Key that two of the main staff—Naoki Hisaya, and OdiakeS—worked on before pursuing a similar line of work in other visual novel studios.

Release historyKanon was released as an adult game on June 4, 1999 in limited and regular editions, playable on a Windows PC as a CD-ROM. The limited edition came bundled with the remix album Anemoscope remixing background music tracks featured in the visual novel. Key released an all ages version on January 7, 2000 for Windows. An updated adult version called the Kanon Standard Edition was released on November 26, 2004 with added support for Windows 2000/XP as a DVD-ROM. The Standard Edition incorporates the extra graphics added to the earlier all ages version of the game, and other technical changes such as more save slots. An all ages version of the Standard Edition was released on January 28, 2005. An updated all ages version of Kanon compatible for Windows Vista PCs was released by Key on July 31, 2009 in a box set containing five other Key visual novels called Key 10th Memorial Box. Another all ages updated version compatible for Windows 7 PCs called Kanon Memorial Edition was released on April 30, 2010.

The first consumer console port of the game was released for the Dreamcast on September 14, 2000 by NEC Interchannel. A PlayStation 2 (PS2) version was released on February 28, 2002 also by NEC Interechannel. The PS2 version was re-released as a "Best" version on December 22, 2004. The PS2 version was bundled in a "Key 3-Part Work Premium Box" package together with the PS2 versions of Air and Clannad released on July 30, 2009. An adult version playable as a Blu-ray Disc was released on December 16, 2011 by Asoberu! BD-Game, a brand of Visual Arts.

Prototype through VisualArt's Motto released a version playable on SoftBank 3G mobile phones on October 27, 2006, and another version playable on FOMA mobile phones in December 2006. A PlayStation Portable (PSP) version of the game was released in Japan on February 15, 2007 by Prototype. The first release of the PSP version came with a special DVD featuring a message from five of the voice actors and a recompiled opening video from the video game version. The five voice actors on the DVD included: Mariko Kōda as Nayuki Minase, Akemi Satō as Shiori Misaka, Mayumi Iizuka as Makoto Sawatari, Yūko Minaguchi as Akiko Minase, and Tomokazu Sugita as Yuichi Aizawa. Yui Horie as Ayu Tsukimiya voiced the short introduction of the DVD, but was not featured in the contents of the DVD itself. A downloadable version of the PSP release via the PlayStation Store was released by Prototype on November 9, 2009. A version playable on Android devices was released on November 30, 2011. An adult version for Android devices was released in January 2013. A version playable on iOS devices was released on April 4, 2013. In the original release, there was no voice acting for the characters, but in the later versions produced for the Dreamcast and PS2, full voice acting was included. The only exception was Yuichi, who was not voiced in either version. However, the PSP release features voice acting for Yuichi, provided by Tomokazu Sugita. Prototype will release a Nintendo Switch version in Japan on April 20, 2023.

Adaptations

Light novels
Five adult light novels written by Mariko Shimizu and published by Paradigm were released in Japan between October 1999 and August 2000. The cover art and internal illustrations were drawn by Itaru Hinoue, the artist who drew the artwork in the visual novel. The basis for each novel was one of each of the five heroines and had titles that were taken from the musical themes pertaining to each character in the original game. The third was  released in April 2000 and the fourth novel was titled The Fox and the Grapes (Makoto), released two months later. The final novel titled  was released in August 2000. Paradigm re-released the five novels in conjunction with Visual Arts under their VA Bunko imprint, which removed the erotic scenes, starting with Yuki no Shōjo on June 27, 2009, and ending with Hidamari no Machi on December 26, 2009. To make up for the missing erotic content, Shimizu wrote additional content for each volume. A sixth novel titled  for the supporting character Sayuri Kurata written by Shimizu and illustrated by Zen was released on March 31, 2011.

Drama CDs and radio shows
A set of five drama CDs were released between September 29, 2000 and April 27, 2001, with each volume focusing on a different heroine. A set of five anthology drama CDs were released between December 22, 2001 and May 25, 2002, with each volume again focusing on a different heroine. A radio show to promote the Dreamcast port of Kanon titled  broadcast 13 episodes between October 6 and December 29, 2000. The show, produced by Movic, was hosted by Yukari Tamura and Tomoko Kawakami, the voices Mai Kawasumi and Sayuri Kurata, respectively. A radio drama titled  broadcast 53 episodes between October 6, 2001 and October 5, 2002. The show, which was broadcast on TBS Radio and Radio Kansai, was hosted by Yūko Minaguchi, the voice of Akiko Minase, and narrated by Atsushi Kisaichi. The voice actors from Kanon were also featured as guests. Five CD compilation volumes containing all of the show's broadcasts were released between August 30, 2002 and April 26, 2003.

Manga
The first Kanon manga illustrated by Petit Morishima was serialized in MediaWorks' manga magazine Dengeki Daioh between the February 2000 and July 2002 issues. The individual chapters were later collected into two separate tankōbon volumes published by MediaWorks under their Dengeki Comics imprint released in September 2000 and on July 27, 2002. There are six chapters in total, three in each volume. Aside from the prologue in volume one and the epilogue in volume two, the other four chapters concern four of the main heroines. From chapters one through four, the main heroines presented are: Shiori Misaka, Makoto Sawatari, Mai Kawasumi and Ayu Tsukimiya. To make up for Nayuki not getting a chapter of her own, the story is altered in that Nayuki is in most of the scenes Yuichi is in. The first manga is different from the visual novel in that Shiori's, Makoto's, and Mai's stories are not told in their entirety. Near the end of each of these girls' stories were originally intended to give the viewer the remaining answers, but the manga version ends these girls' stories prematurely. This was due to the manga putting more focus on Ayu's story.

The second manga illustrated by Kinusa Shimotsuki, under the main title  with the subtitle each regret of Kanon, was serialized between volumes two and seven of Fujimi Shobo's Dragon Age Pure magazine sold between June 29, 2006 and October 20, 2007, respectively. The first volume was released in Japan on April 1, 2007 and focused on Nayuki's story. The second volume was released on December 8, 2007 and focused on the other four heroines. There are nine chapters in total, five in volume one and four in volume two.

There have also been many releases of manga anthologies produced by different companies and drawn by a multitude of different artists. The first volume of the earliest anthology series, released by Ichijinsha under the title Kanon Comic Anthology, was released in November 2000 under their DNA Media Comics label. Volumes for this series continued to be released for another two years, ending in December 2002 with the 14th volume; an additional 15th volume was released later in February 2007. Ichijinsha also released two more volumes of anthology collections of four-panel comic strips titled Kanon 4-koma Kings in April and June 2001. Softgarage released an anthology in a single volume in December 2002 titled Kanon Anthology Comic. In April 2004, Ohzora released an anthology composed of works based on both Kanon and Air titled Haru Urara: Kanon & Air.

Between June and August 2004, Ohzora also released five separate volumes of manga based on Kanon drawn by five separate artists. Ohzora later collected some of the previously published manga anthologies into two volumes titled Kanon Anthology Comics Best Selection released in December 2006 and January 2007. Additionally, Ohzora released another 13 volumes of an anthology series titled Kanon under their Twin Heart Comics label. The now-bankrupt publisher Raporto also released 21 manga anthology volumes titled Kanon under their Raporto Comics label between November 2000 and October 2002. The last manga anthology, a collection of four-panel comic strips released in a single volume by Enterbrain titled Magi-Cu 4-koma Kanon, was released in January 2007 under their MC Comics label. Each of the anthology series are written and drawn by an average of 20 people per volume.

Anime

The first Kanon anime was produced by the Japanese animation studio Toei Animation and directed by Naoyuki Itō. Thirteen episodes were produced and aired in Japan on Fuji TV between January 31 and March 28, 2002. The series also later aired on Kansai TV. Later, a single original video animation (OVA) episode titled "Kanon Kazahana" was released in March 2003. The anime series and OVA used the songs "Florescence" and "Flower" for the opening and ending themes, respectively. While it does not appear as the ending theme in the first 12 episodes or in the OVA, the game's ending theme "Where the Wind Reaches" is used as the ending theme for the series in episode 13. Additionally, the game's opening theme "Last regrets" is played near the end of episode 13 during the flashback scene.

Starting in 2006, Kyoto Animation, the animators of another Key game-turned-anime, Air, decided to animate a new adaptation of Kanon. This version, directed by Tatsuya Ishihara and written by Fumihiko Shimo, aired between October 5, 2006 and March 15, 2007 on BS-i, containing 24 episodes. The series was later rebroadcast on TBS. ADV Films announced on September 21, 2007 at the Anime Weekend Atlanta anime convention that they have officially licensed the second Kanon anime series. ADV had previously posted a trailer for the series in August 2007, but was soon taken offline once the news had been spread on the Internet. The first English-dubbed episode was made available via streaming online at Anime News Network between December 23 and December 30, 2007. In July 2008, the licensing rights of the second Kanon anime were transferred from ADV to Funimation Entertainment (now known as Crunchyroll as of ) who continued to produce the series in North America. MVM Entertainment released Kanon on DVD in the United Kingdom on April 14, 2022.

The second TV Kanon animation features updated animation quality, and uses the same voice acting cast as the first anime, with the exception of Yuichi and Kuze. Unlike the first anime, the actual theme songs from the Kanon game are used for the second anime's opening theme, ending theme and soundtrack. There is one song featured as an insert song in episode 16 that did not come from the visual novel titled "Last regrets (X'mas floor style)" by Eiko Shimamiya from I've Sound's first album Regret. Other songs are used from the arrange albums released over the years, which include Anemoscope, Recollections, Re-feel, and Ma-Na.

Music

The visual novel has two main theme songs, the opening theme "Last regrets", and the ending theme , both sung by Ayana. The lyrics for both songs were written by Jun Maeda, and arranged by Kazuya Takase of I've Sound. The five heroines have leitmotifs.

The first music album released was Anemoscope which came bundled with the original release of Kanon in June 1999. The next release was a single, "Last regrets/Place of wind which arrives", which contained the opening and ending themes plus arranged versions of three background music tracks and a male vocal version of the opening theme. A compilation album containing tracks from the two albums was released in December 2001 called Recollections. The game's original soundtrack was released in October 2002 containing 22 different tracks along with short versions of the two theme songs. A piano arrange album was released in December 2003 called Re-feel which contained five tracks from Kanon and five from Air. Excluding the first two albums, each of the albums released for the visual novel version were released on Key's record label Key Sounds Label; this is due to the first two albums being released before the label was formed.

The first anime's first original soundtrack was released in May 2002, and a second followed in July 2002. The first anime's opening theme is "Florescence" and the ending theme is "Flower", both sung by Miho Fujiwara; the maxi single containing the anime's opening and ending themes was released in June 2002. An album containing music box arranged tracks of music from the first anime was released in July 2003 called Orgel de Kiku Sakuhin Shū. The albums released for the first anime were produced by Frontier Works and Movic. A single was released in commemoration for the second anime called "Last regrets/Kaze no Tadoritsuku Basho" which contained the game's original opening and ending themes in original, short, and remixed versions; the album was produced by Key Sounds Label.

Reception and legacy
According to a national ranking of how well bishōjo games sold nationally in Japan, the original Kanon release for Windows achieved its highest rank at number two in the ranking. Three years later in June 2002, the original release ranked in again at 45, and then again at 46 the following two weeks. The original release also made the ranking after that at number 41 in early July 2002. The Kanon Standard Edition premiered at number 16 in the rankings. The Kanon Standard Edition remained on the top 50 list for the next two months, achieving the rankings of 47 and 35. The all ages version of the Kanon Standard Edition premiered at number 42 on the national ranking, went up to 35 the next month, and did not appear on the rankings after that. The Dreamcast port sold 42,379 units in the first week and was the fourth top selling console game in Japan for that week. Kanon has sold over 300,000 units across several platforms, not counting the PSP release.

Five days before the first PS2 release for Kanon, a PS2 printer called Tapis MPR-505 went on sale which enabled the user to print out game screens. Kanon was one of the three games supported at launch, the other two being America Ōden Ultra Quiz from DigiCube and Marle de Jigsaw from Nippon Ichi Software. The first PS2 release in 2002 was reviewed by the Japanese video game magazine Famitsu where the game received an overall score of 29/40 (out of the four individual review scores of 7, 8, 7, and 7). Yūichi Suzumoto commented in an interview in March 2001 that he felt the end of Kanons story could be summed up as "the prince and princess live happily ever after. The end," resulting in an ending that does not expand on what could possibly happen afterwards. In the October 2007 issue of Dengeki G's Magazine, poll results for the 50 best bishōjo games were released. Out of 249 titles, Kanon ranked fifth with 71 votes.

Characters from Kanon have appeared in several dōjin games not directly based on the Kanon series such as the Eternal Fighter Zero game by Twilight Frontier where most of the playable characters either came from Kanon or from One: Kagayaku Kisetsu e. The dōjin game Glove on Fight featured at least two Kanon characters: Ayu Tsukimiya and Akiko Minase in a fighting style game along with various other characters taken from other media. The character Ayu Tsukimiya in particular is known to appear in works outside Kanon, such as in strip 67 of the webcomic Megatokyo where Ayu is shown eating taiyaki.

The second Kanon anime series was reviewed at Anime News Network where Theron Martin commented how the series is a "formulaic moe haremfest", and how the moe aspects of the series may make viewers "feel like they're drowning in a vat of gooey cuteness". The series is described as being similar to the anime television adaptation of Air, saying "Like Air, the first four episodes can be simply summarized as 'male lead arrives in town and kills time interacting with cute girls.' Unlike Air, however, these interactions can occasionally be very funny." Martin also compares Kanon to the anime adaptation of Shuffle! which is described as "bombing" where Kanon "works". The reviewer chalks this up to the characters "endear[ing] themselves to the viewer...far better than what Shuffle!'s do." Martin cites the transition between humor and serious content as a defining feature of the series. However, Martin comments how one of the series' flaws is how it "overplays the mundane cutesiness and moe cards at times" causing little to happen with the plot. Yuichi is described as being "too erratic to be fully credible" or easily believable. Despite the series' drawbacks, Martin still describes the series as "one of the best moe-centric series to date" and lauds Kyoto Animation's production values making Kanon "one of the prettiest-looking anime series of the past year". Martin adds another series comparison, citing Kanon as the "polar opposite of Gurren Lagann''", which deals primarily in its action-oriented content.

Notes

References

External links

Kanon at Key 
Kanon anime at Toei Animation 
Kanon anime at TBS 
Kanon anime at Funimation

1999 Japanese novels
1999 video games
2000 manga
2002 anime television series debuts
2002 Japanese television series debuts
2002 Japanese television series endings
2003 anime OVAs
2006 anime television series debuts
2006 Japanese television series debuts
2006 manga
2007 Japanese television series endings
ADV Films
Android (operating system) games
Anime television series based on video games
ASCII Media Works manga
Bishōjo games
Book franchises
Dengeki Comics
Dengeki Daioh
Dreamcast games
Eroge
Fuji TV original programming
Fujimi Shobo manga
Funimation
Harem anime and manga
Harem video games
Ichijinsha manga
IOS games
Japan-exclusive video games
Kadokawa Dwango franchises
 
Key (company) games
Kyoto Animation
Light novels
Manga based on video games
Mobile games
Nintendo Switch games
OVAs based on video games
PlayStation 2 games
PlayStation Portable games
Prototype (company) games
School life in anime and manga
Shōnen manga
Single-player video games
TBS Television (Japan) original programming
Toei Animation television
VA Bunko
Video games developed in Japan
Video games scored by Jun Maeda
Video games scored by Magome Togoshi
Visual novels
Windows games